Major H. Rahmat Shigeru Ono (September 26, 1918 – August 25, 2014) was a Japanese soldier who defected and sided with Indonesia. When Japan was defeated by the Allies, Rahmat Shigeru Ono became one of the troops who refused to return to Japan and chose to join the Indonesian people to seize independence, they were known as the elite commandos of the Pasukan Gerilya Spesial (Special Guerrilla Force) under Untung Surapati's troops.

Biography 
Before his left hand was slashed by the explosion of the grenade, Ono was known to be an expert in using the Katana, once using only the Katana, Ono and another soldier were able to slaughter 20 or so Dutch troops who were about to ambush them. These troops attacked the Dutch post in Pajajaran, Malang and trained TNI troops at the foot of Mount Semeru.

After the recognition of sovereignty, July 1950, Ono married Darkasih. Their first child was born on June 24, 1951, and was named Tutik. However, in 1952 when Ono was summoned by the Japanese Consul General in Surabaya, he managed to reconnect with his mother. Whereas previously, after deciding to join Indonesia, Ono had sent a letter saying he had died. By the mother, she was asked to change her child's name to Atsuko.

In the same year, Ono became an Indonesian citizen. Unfortunately, his wife died of cancer in 1982. The story of his life is told in a book entitled Those Who Have Been Forgotten: Memoirs of Rahmat Shigeru Ono, Former Japanese Soldiers who took the Republican side by Eiichi Hayashi. He has 4 children, 10 grandchildren, 6 great-grandchildren.

Ono died on August 25, 2014, due to illness. In fact, President Susilo Bambang Yudhoyono at that time asked him to be present at the State Palace to celebrate the Independence of the Republic of Indonesia.

References 

1918 births
2014 deaths
Japanese military personnel
Indonesian military personnel
Japanese defectors
Naturalised citizens of Indonesia
Japanese emigrants to Indonesia